Yuma Regional Medical Center (YRMC) is a hospital in Yuma, Arizona. It began in 1958 under the name Parkview Hospital.

In November 2020 during the COVID19 pandemic the hospital did not allow an emergency physician, Cleavon Gilman, to continue work due to his providing information on social media about the COVID-19 pandemic in Arizona. Subsequently in December 2020 the hospital was facing a critical staffing shortage.

History 
Yuma Regional Medical Center was founded as Parkview Hospital in 1958.

In 1961, the Baptist Hospital Association of Arizona assumed management of the hospital and renamed it Parkview Baptist Hospital.

In 1972, management of the hospital was transferred to the Yuma community, which renamed it Yuma Regional Medical Center.

In 2004, a new six-story hospital tower was completed, adding a 42-bed ICU, a heart center, and over 140 new regular beds.

In 2013, YRMC became a teaching facility with the addition of a graduate medical education (GME) program in Family and Community Medicine.

In July 2014 the Yuma Regional Cancer Center was opened. The Center provides comprehensive cancer care. In 2018 the center was certified by the Commission on Cancer, a part of the American College of Surgeons.

Services

Specialties 
Specialties available include:
 Diabetes & Endocrinology
 Gastroenterology & GI Surgery
 Geriatrics
 Nephrology
 Neurology & Neurosurgery
 Orthopedics
 Pulmonology
 Urology

Procedures and conditions
Some of the procedures that are performed include:
 Abdominal Aortic Aneurysm Repair
 Aortic Valve Surgery
 Chronic Obstructive Pulmonary Disease (COPD)
 Colon Cancer Surgery
 Heart Bypass Surgery
 Heart Failure
 Hip Replacement
 Knee Replacement
 Lung Cancer Surgery

Leadership 
The following comprise the Executive Leadership Team:

References

External links 
 YRMC's Website

Buildings and structures in Yuma, Arizona
Hospitals established in 1958